Venera Terra  is a landform on the dwarf planet Pluto, discovered by the New Horizons spacecraft.

References

Regions of Pluto